Split the Country, Split the Street is Kevin Devine's third studio album. It was released in 2005, being the second of two albums released on Triple Crown Records. It is the first solo record released after Kevin was no longer in Miracle of 86 (a band in which he was the lead singer). The album features more rock oriented songs with fuller band arrangements than his previous two releases, and was produced by Chris Bracco, Mike Skinner & Kevin Devine.

Kevin said of the album: "Split the Country was done after the band [Miracle of 86] broke up, like the hangover from that. It was more bi-polar: aggressive rock songs with fuller instrumentation, but also songs with violins and glockenspiel or just a guy with a guitar."

Despite the break, the album features former Miracle of 86 member Mike Robertson on guitar for three songs.

Early versions of "Haircut" and "Probably" feature on the Travelling the EU EP.

The German record label, Defiance Records, released a double LP set with both Split the Country, Split the Street and Kevin's previous album, Make the Clocks Move.

In a 2011 interview with Triple Crown Records' founder Fred Feldman, when asked about a possible re-issue of Split the Country, Split the Street, he responded with "We’re going to do the other Kevin Devine record [Split the Country, Split the Street] as well". The re-issue was released on November 20, 2012 on CD and LP with two bonus tracks, new artwork and new liner notes by Kevin and Matt Pinfield.

Track listing
 "Cotton Crush"  – 3:30  featuring Jesse Lacey
 "Afterparty"  – 3:48  featuring Jesse Lacey
 "No Time Flat"  – 4:18
 "Keep Ringing Your Bell"  – 3:09
 "No One Else's Problem"  – 2:39  featuring Jesse Lacey
 "Buried by the Buzz"  – 3:38
 "Haircut"  – 3:29
 "Probably"  – 3:58
 "Alabama Acres"  – 4:35
 "Yr Damned Ol' Dad"  – 2:35
 "The Shift Change Splits the Streets"  – 3:36
 "You Are the Daybreak"  – 2:33
 "Lord, I Know We Don't Talk"  – 5:34
 "Bruise in a Brushwash"* - 3:29
 "Order in the Court"* - 4:39

* "Bruise in a Brushwash" and "Order in the Court" are bonus tracks on the 2012 re-issue.

References

Kevin Devine albums
2005 albums
Triple Crown Records albums
Defiance Records albums